The 1959 National Football League draft had its first four rounds held on December 1, 1958, and its final twenty-six rounds on January 21, 1959. Both sessions were held at the Warwick Hotel in Philadelphia. With the first overall pick in the draft, the Green Bay Packers selected quarterback Randy Duncan.

Player selections

Round one

Round two

Round three

Round four

Round five

Round six

Round seven

Round eight

Round nine

Round ten

Round eleven

Round twelve

Round thirteen

Round fourteen

Round fifteen

Round sixteen

Round seventeen

Round eighteen

Round nineteen

Round twenty

Round twenty-one

Round twenty-two

Round twenty-three

Round twenty-four

Round twenty-five

Round twenty-six

Round twenty-seven

Round twenty-eight

Round twenty-nine

Round thirty

Hall of Famers
 Dick LeBeau, defensive back from Ohio State University taken 5th round 58th overall by the Cleveland Browns.
Inducted: Professional Football Hall of Fame class of 2010.

Notable undrafted players

References

External links
 NFL.com – 1959 Draft
 databaseFootball.com – 1959 Draft
 Pro Football Hall of Fame

National Football League Draft
 Draft
NFL Draft
NFL Draft
NFL Draft
NFL Draft
1950s in Philadelphia
American football in Philadelphia
Events in Philadelphia